Ingleses do Rio Vermelho is a district of Florianópolis located in the northeast of the island of Santa Catarina, between the districts of Cachoeira do Bom Jesus and São João do Rio Vermelho, created by a decree in 1831 . The origin of its name is attributed to the sinking of an English ship, occurring in the mid-eighteenth century, when some crew members opted to reside in the region.

It has an area of 20.47 square kilometers and its population in 2000 was 16,514 inhabitants.

Located 56 km (35 miles) from downtown, the Ingleses Beach has the largest resident population. Large investments were made in recent years, giving the resort of tourism infrastructure made up of hotels, guesthouses, bars and restaurants which allows you to receive tourists in any season.

Much of the local population is from other cities and states, and the Azores culture today is not so apparent as in other localities of the island.  Throughout the year, various religious festivals are held. The main activities are related to trade, the construction industry and especially to tourism. Fishing, which for many years was the main livelihood of the population, is still an industry throughout the year.

References

Neighbourhoods in Florianópolis